Thomas Frederick Price, MM (August 19, 1860 - September 12, 1919) was the American co-founder of the Catholic Foreign Mission Society of America, better known as the Maryknoll Fathers and Brothers.

Youth and education
Thomas Frederick Price was born in Wilmington, North Carolina, the eighth of ten children of Alfred and Clarissa Bond Price. His parents were converts to the Catholic faith, and he was raised as a devout Catholic amid Southern apathy toward Catholicism. His older sisters, Margaret and Mary, left to become Sisters of Mercy.

As a youth, Price was deeply influenced by his parish priests (St. Thomas, Wilmington, North Carolina). One cleric who figured prominently in his early life was James Gibbons, newly appointed the first Vicar Apostolic of North Carolina. Gibbons established his headquarters at St. Thomas Church; Price often served Mass for Gibbons and accompanied him on official trips throughout the Vicariate.

With his religious background (especially the deep devotion of his mother to the Blessed Virgin Mary), Price soon felt an attraction to the priesthood. He confided his interest to the parish priest, Mark Gross, and arrangements were made for him to enter St. Charles College at Catonsville, Maryland, in August 1876. En route to the seminary by ship, Price escaped death in the shipwreck of the Rebecca Clyde. Price attributed his survival to the Blessed Virgin Mary's intercession. After the accident, he returned home until January 1877.

Price attended St. Charles College from January 1877 until his commencement on June 28, 1881. In September 1881, he entered St. Mary's Seminary in Baltimore. He was ordained to the priesthood on June 20, 1886, by Gibbon's successor, Henry P. Northrop, at the pro-cathedral in Wilmington, North Carolina. (Both of Price's parents had died before his ordination.) Price was the first native North Carolinian to be ordained to the priesthood, and he was assigned to missionary work in the eastern section of his home state.

Early priesthood

Within the first year of his ordination, Price was appointed pastor of the few Catholics in Asheville and New Bern. He later obtained permission from Leo Haid, the current Vicar Apostolic, to begin a statewide evangelization program. His methods were influenced by Walter Elliott, a famous Paulist preacher. Based out of New Bern, Price traveled by buggy a "circuit" comprising seventeen missions. He was pastor at New Bern for nine years. From there he was transferred to Sacred Heart Church in Raleigh.

One of Price's tools for evangelization was the publication of the magazine Truth, which he began to edit and publish in April 1897. In 1912, the magazine passed into the hands of the International Catholic Truth Society, with the guarantee that the Truth Society would enable the publication to reach its full potential. Fr. Price's active role in the Foreign Mission Seminary by this time made his continued involvement in the publication impossible.

In 1899, Price, along with his sister, Sister Mary Agnes of the Sisters of Mercy, founded a Catholic Orphanage on a large tract of land which he purchased in Nazareth, North Carolina. Price's plan was first to help the underprivileged of an area and thereby win the general population's favor, who would then be more inclined to listen to the missioner's message. (The location later became the site of the first Cardinal Gibbons Memorial High School and is now the site of Holy Name of Jesus Cathedral.)

Following the success of the Nazareth Orphanage, Price organized summer catechizing teams of seminarians. Finally, in 1902, Price opened a missionary training house at Nazareth. It was a preparatory seminary whose sole purpose was the education and formation of missioners for the home missions. It was called Regina Apostolorum. Price directed the Regina Apostolorum and acted as its primary teacher and spiritual director.

Plans for a foreign mission seminary
As time went on, Price began to emphasize more and more often, in the pages of Truth, the need for a seminary to train young American men for foreign missions. At the same time, James Anthony Walsh, of Boston, was developing the same idea in the pages of The Field Afar. At the Eucharistic Congress in Montreal in 1910, the two priests began to formulate plans for the establishment of a seminary for foreign missioners. With the American hierarchy's approval, the two priests traveled to Rome in June 1911 to receive final approval from Pope Pius X for their project.

After meeting with the Pope, Price traveled to Lourdes for the first time. During his stay at Lourdes, Price had a spiritual experience that he refers to in his diary: he maintained a special devotion to Our Lady of Lourdes and to Bernadette Soubirous until his death.

Returning to the United States, Price and Walsh began establishing the new seminary and the foreign mission society. After a brief stay at Hawthorne, New York, the property was purchased at Ossining, New York, for the site of the new foundation, the Catholic Foreign Mission Society of America (popularly known as Maryknoll).

Foreign missions begin

Price made a countrywide tour of America to gain support for the new endeavor. By 1918, three young priests (James Edward Walsh, Francis Xavier Ford, and Bernard F. Meyer) were ready for the foreign missions in China. On September 7, Price went with them as superior to the new mission. From the time of Maryknoll's foundation, Price had understood that Walsh was capable of administering and directing the seminary itself. Price himself had always hoped to be chosen as one of Maryknoll's first missioners, and his dream was realized.

This group of the first four American missioners in China arrived in Hong Kong in October 1918. They then settled down in Yeungkong (now called Yangjiang) on the South China Coast. Because of his age and its complexity, Price had great difficulty learning the Chinese language

Price also suffered from physical ailments. Towards the latter part of 1919, Price became seriously ill. As there were no adequate medical facilities in that area, he was brought to Hong Kong for hospitalization. After a trying trip, Price arrived in the British Colony and was immediately taken to St. Paul's Hospital in Causeway Bay, an institution conducted by the Sisters of St. Paul de Chartres. The long and arduous journey from Yeungkong to Hong Kong by primitive means of travel aggravated Price's advanced and serious case of appendicitis. He entered the hospital on 19 August 1919 and was operated on 8 September 1919. However, it was too late, and on 12 September, the Feast of the Holy Name of Mary, he died due to a burst appendix at five minutes past ten o'clock. His dear friend Father Tour had been with him at his side, as they recited the prayers for the commendation of Fr. Price's soul. His body was buried in the priests’ plot in St. Michael's Cemetery in Happy Valley, Hong Kong. The date of his death was rather significant, as he had a great devotion to Our Lady. He was only 59.

A solemn requiem Mass was celebrated on 18 September 1919 at the Immaculate Conception Cathedral for his priestly soul's happy repose. At this ceremony, Bishop of the Catholic Diocese of Hong Kong, Pozzoni, gave the last absolution, and a large concourse of priests and Sisters attended

In 1923, a French missioner returned to France with Price's heart and gave it to St. Bernadette's religious order, the Sisters of Charity of Nevers. It was placed in a niche in the wall near the saint's body in the Motherhouse of the Sisters of Nevers. It was Price's request, for he had a very great devotion to Sister Bernadette. Price's body was exhumed in 1936 and transferred to Maryknoll Cemetery in Ossining, New York. In 1955, his remains, together with James A. Walsh's, were finally interred in the crypt below the Maryknoll Seminary Chapel.

In March 2012, the Diocese of Raleigh formerly opened a formal Cause for the Beatification and Canonization of Father Thomas Price.

Writings
 Bernadette of Lourdes (2013)
 The Lily of Mary (2013)

References

Bibliography 
 John T. Sedden, When Saints Are Lovers. The Spirituality of Maryknoll Founder Thomas F. Price, Liturgical Press (1997), 184 pages

External links 
 
 Maryknoll priests visit grave of Fr. Price in Hong Kong, China, 1923. from USC digital library Website

Founders of Catholic religious communities
1860 births
1919 deaths
American Roman Catholic missionaries
American Roman Catholic priests
Maryknoll Fathers
People from Wilmington, North Carolina
American Servants of God
Deaths from appendicitis
Catholics from North Carolina